Mzyki  is a village in the administrative district of Gmina Woźniki, within Lubliniec County, Silesian Voivodeship, in southern Poland.

The village has a population of 114.

References

Mzyki